Bodyguards is a British television crime drama/action series, broadcast on ITV, that focuses on the cases of a specialized bodyguard unit, the Close Protection Group, in service of the British government. The series starred Sean Pertwee and Louise Lombard as protagonists Ian Worrell and Liz Shaw. Pertwee's father, Jon, notably also starred alongside a character called Liz Shaw, played by Caroline John, who was his first companion during his time playing the Third Doctor in Doctor Who. The series was the brainchild of Jeffrey Caine, known as the creator of The Chief and script editor of the James Bond movie GoldenEye.

A total of seven episodes were broadcast: a feature-length pilot which aired in 1996, which guest starred Josette Simon as a visiting dignitary, followed by a single series of six episodes in 1997. The series has never been released on VHS or DVD, but was uploaded in full to YouTube in March 2016 by a member of the original production crew. The series was also broadcast by GBC TV (Gibraltar) as part of its relaunch in early 1999. The series aired on Monday evenings at 9:30pm, and the series received a full repeat run later on in the year.

Cast
 Sean Pertwee as Ian Worrell
 Louise Lombard as Liz Shaw
 John Shrapnel as Commander Alan MacIntyre
 Pip Torrens as Robert Ferguson
 Geoffrey Beevers as DAC James Henty
 Robert Horwell as DC Fitton

Episodes

Pilot (1996)

Series 1 (1997)

Critical reception
Thomas Sutcliffe of The Independent said of the series; "When you start this job, you never think you're going to get bored," said one of the lumpy-jacketed characters in Bodyguards. It was a remark that might have been designed to extract a moan of sympathy from television reviewers, coming, as it did, halfway through this dim and derivative thriller, one of those professionals-with-guns series that give a distinguished theatrical actor the opportunity to look steely and say "shit". In this case, the man in question is John Shrapnel, taking the role of the sternly parental head of a police protection unit. His charges are played by Louise Lombard and Sean Pertwee, as well as disposable cannon-fodder who can be dispatched relatively early in the story to demonstrate that theirs is not just a nine-to-five job. In last night's episode, they were assigned to protect a businessman, back in England to give evidence before a select committee about a dodgy arms deal. Cue tough jargon ("Red One. Position set. Principal landed. 11.04") and a pretty standard plot involving conspiracy in high places."

References

External links
 

ITV television dramas
1996 British television series debuts
1997 British television series endings
1990s British drama television series
Television series by ITV Studios
Carlton Television
English-language television shows
Television shows set in London
Works about bodyguards